Cleradini is a tribe of dirt-colored seed bugs in the family Rhyparochromidae. There are about 19 genera and more than 50 described species in Cleradini.

Genera
These 19 genera belong to the tribe Cleradini:

 Arcleda Malipatil, 1981
 Austroclerada Malipatil, 1981
 Clerada Signoret, 1863
 Clerocarbus Scudder, 1969
 Dendezia Scudder, 1963
 Dyakana Distant, 1906
 Harmostica Bergroth, 1918
 Kanadyana Scudder, 1963
 Laticlerada Malipatil, 1981
 Mahisa Distant, 1906
 Navarrus Distant, 1901
 Neoclerada Malipatil, 1981
 Pactye Stal, 1865
 Panchaea Stal, 1865
 Paramahisa Malipatil, 1981
 Parapactye Malipatil, 1983
 Pholeolygaeus Deboutteville & Paulian, 1952
 Prehensocoris Harrington, 1988
 Reclada White, 1878

References

Further reading

 

Rhyparochromidae